Walter Lynch may refer to:

Walter Lynch (footballer) (1896–?), English footballer
Walter Lynch (mayor), mayor of Galway
Walter Lynch (bishop), Irish prelate
Walter A. Lynch (1894–1957), American politician from New York
Walt Lynch (1897–1976), backup catcher in Major League Baseball